Pine Forge Mansion and Industrial Site, also known as Rutter's Mansion and Pine Forge Iron Plantation, is a historic iron plantation and mansion and national historic district located in Douglass Township, Berks County, Pennsylvania.  It has five contributing buildings, four contributing sites, and one contributing structure. They are the stone mansion or manor house, stone root cellar and smokehouse, "caretaker's cottage," garage, and small stone "worker's" house. The original section of the manor house was built about 1730, with additions made about 1800 and in 1918.  The contributing sites are the remains of a dam, remains of a grist mill, and ruins of two stone buildings.  The contributing structure is the remains of a mill race. The property now the site of Pine Forge Academy.

It was listed on the National Register of Historic Places in 2004.

References

Houses on the National Register of Historic Places in Pennsylvania
Historic districts on the National Register of Historic Places in Pennsylvania
Houses completed in 1918
Houses in Berks County, Pennsylvania
Industrial buildings and structures on the National Register of Historic Places in Pennsylvania
National Register of Historic Places in Berks County, Pennsylvania